Rudolf Vuk (9 September 1913 – 7 August 1962) was a Yugoslav sports shooter. He competed in the 50 m pistol event at the 1952 Summer Olympics.

References

1913 births
1962 deaths
Yugoslav male sport shooters
Olympic shooters of Yugoslavia
Shooters at the 1952 Summer Olympics
People from Krapina-Zagorje County